William Wallace Chalmers (November 1, 1861 – October 1, 1944) was a U.S. Representative from Ohio.

Born in Strathroy, Ontario, Canada, Chalmers moved with his parents to Kent County, near Grand Rapids, Michigan, in 1865.
He attended the public schools, and Michigan State Normal School.
He graduated from the University of Michigan at Ann Arbor in 1887, from Eureka College in 1889, and from Heidelberg University, Tiffin, Ohio, in 1904.
He was a teacher and principal of schools until 1890.
Superintendent of schools in Grand Rapids, Michigan from 1890 to 1898 and in Toledo, Ohio from 1898 to 1905.
He served as president of the University of Toledo in 1904.
He engaged at different periods in farming, lumbering and, in the real-estate and insurance business at Toledo, Ohio.

Chalmers was elected as a Republican to the Sixty-seventh Congress (March 4, 1921 – March 3, 1923).
He was an unsuccessful candidate for reelection in 1922 to the Sixty-eighth Congress.

Chalmers was elected to the Sixty-ninth, Seventieth, and Seventy-first Congresses (March 4, 1925 – March 3, 1931).
He was an unsuccessful candidate for renomination in 1930.
He died in Indianapolis, Indiana, on October 1, 1944.
He was interred in Crown Hill Cemetery.

Sources

External links

1861 births
1944 deaths
Heidelberg University (Ohio) alumni
Republican Party members of the United States House of Representatives from Ohio
People from Kent County, Michigan
Politicians from Toledo, Ohio
Burials at Crown Hill Cemetery
School superintendents in Michigan
Eureka College alumni
Eastern Michigan University alumni
University of Michigan alumni
Presidents of the University of Toledo
Pre-Confederation Canadian emigrants to the United States
People from Strathroy-Caradoc
Educators from Ohio
Educators from Michigan
School superintendents in Ohio